An Intelligent Person's Guide to Atheism is the first book by Daniel Harbour, an Oxford maths and philosophy graduate, who at the time of writing was working for a PhD in linguistics at MIT.

Synopsis 

Rather than a history of atheism, as the title may suggest, the book is a guide to why (according to the author) atheism is superior to theism and why the (a)theist discussion is important.

According to Harbour, atheism is "the plausible and probably correct belief that God does not exist", while theism is "the implausible and probably incorrect belief that God does exist", and anyone who cares about the truth should be an atheist. Harbour makes his case on the basis of two fundamental worldviews which he labels the Spartan Meritocracy and the Baroque Monarchy. Worldviews are the ways in which we look at and try to explain the world around us; as a result, the validity of our worldviews is extremely important because it determines the validity and reasonableness of our beliefs.

The Spartan Meritocracy makes minimal assumptions, that are subject to criticism and possible revision, when trying to explain the world - focusing more upon a proper method of inquiry than on reaching any particular or prejudicial conclusions. The Baroque Monarchy, however, relies upon elaborate dogmatic assumptions in the absence of any evidence — assumptions which are placed beyond question, critique or revision.

Harbour spends little time directly comparing atheism and theism; rather, he compares these two opposing worldviews and argues that the Spartan Meritocracy is more plausible, more reasonable, and helps make the world a better place to live. Thus, anyone who cares about the truth should be inclined to adopt it rather than blind obedience to dogmatism as in the Baroque Monarchy.

He does not, however, argue that there is a direct and necessary connection between these worldviews and either atheism or theism — he acknowledges that it is possible in theory for an atheist to adopt the Baroque Monarchy and for some types of theist to adopt the Spartan Meritocracy. Strictly speaking, then, the main thrust of his argument is that the Spartan Meritocracy is superior and anyone who cares about the truth should adopt this worldview. Nevertheless, he also argues that it is highly unlikely for theism ever to occur within the Spartan Meritocracy due to the evidence the world presents, and that, consequently, anyone who adopts the Spartan Meritocracy will almost inevitably be an atheist. Harbour constructs an argument throughout the book to demonstrate that the Spartan Meritocracy leads logically and naturally to atheism rather than theism.

Much of Daniel Harbour's book is focused on demonstrating the ways in which the Spartan Meritocracy does a better job of helping us to explain the world and make the world a better place to live in. The former involves analyzing the impact of science and technology, pursuits fundamentally based upon a spartan and meritocratic perspective of nature.

"It would be one thing to abandon the paradigm of rational enquiry if it were merely a proposal on paper. However, centuries of effort have made it much more: it is the most successful attempt to understand the world that the world has ever seen. By dint of breadth, the paradigm stands out. Through the sum total of its theories, it covers more facts, explains more phenomena, and unmasks the mechanisms of more one-time mysteries than any alternative."

See also 
Atheism
Theism
Argument from design
Argument from first cause
Argument from suffering

External links 
An Intelligent Person’s Guide to Atheism at Amazon

2001 non-fiction books
Books critical of religion
Philosophy books
Books about atheism